The 2005–06 California Golden Bears men's basketball team represented the University of California, Berkeley in the 2005–06 NCAA Division I men's basketball season. This was head coach Ben Braun's tenth season at California. The Golden Bears played their home games at Haas Pavilion and participated in the Pacific-10 Conference. The Golden Bears finished the season 20–11, 12–6 in Pac-10 play to finish in third place. They lost to UCLA in the championship game of the Pac-10 tournament. They received an at–large bid to the 2006 NCAA Division I men's basketball tournament, earning a 7 seed in the South region. They were beaten by 10 seed NC State in the first round.

Roster

Source

Schedule and results

|-
!colspan=9 style=| Non-conference regular season

|-
!colspan=9 style=| Pac-10 Regular Season

|-
!colspan=9 style=| Pac-10 tournament

|-
!colspan=9 style=| NCAA tournament

Source

Rankings

References

California
California
California Golden Bears men's basketball seasons
California Golden Bears men's b
California Golden Bears men's b